Sergey Leonidovich Sokolov (1 July 191131 August 2012) was a Soviet military commander, Hero of the Soviet Union, and served as Minister of Defence of the Soviet Union from 22 December 1984 until 29 May 1987.

Biography

The son of an Imperial Russian army officer, Sokolov served in the Battle of Lake Khasan during the Soviet-Japanese Border Wars and also fought against Nazi Germany during World War II.

He was Commander of the Leningrad Military District from 1965 to 1967 and First Deputy Defense Minister from 1967 to 1984.

Sokolov was promoted to Marshal of the Soviet Union in 1978. He was in charge of Soviet ground forces during the Soviet invasion of Afghanistan. He personally led the main Soviet incursion of ground forces on December 27, 1979. His actions and command strategies during the war made him one of the Soviet Union's most respected Marshals. On April 28, 1980 he was awarded the title Hero of the Soviet Union.

Sokolov was appointed Minister of Defense of the Soviet Union in 1984 and held this post until 1987, when  he was dismissed by Mikhail Gorbachev as a result of the Mathias Rust affair. He was also a candidate (non-voting) member of the Politburo from 1985 to 1987.

From 1992, Sokolov was an advisor to the Minister of Defense of the Russian Federation. In July 2001, he became an honorary citizen of Crimea, Ukraine.

On turning 100 he stated, "Military service prestige will regain the importance it once had."

Sokolov died of undisclosed causes on 31 August 2012, at the age of 101. He was buried on 3 September with full military honors at the Novodevichy Cemetery in Moscow, next to his wife of 70 years, Maria Samojlovna Sokolova (16 December 1919 – 28 August 2012) who had predeceased him three days prior.

He was survived by two sons, Colonel-General (Retd.) Valery Sergeyevich (born September 30, 1940), now a lecturer at the Faculty of Command and General Staff Military Academy, and Colonel-General (Retd.) Vladimir Sergeyevich (born January 22, 1947), who had retired during the war in Afghanistan and was chief of staff of the 40th Army.

Dates of rank
From the corresponding article in the Russian Wikipedia
Cadet (May 1932 – November 1934)
Platoon Commander – November 1934
Junior Lieutenant – 1935
Lieutenant – 1938
Captain – 1941
Major – before 1943
Lieutenant Colonel – before 1943
Colonel – 9 September 1943
Major General – 3 August 1953
Lieutenant General – 25 May 1959
Colonel General – 13 April 1963
General of the Army – 12 April 1967
Marshal of the Soviet Union – 17 February 1978

Honours and awards
Russia
 Order of Merit for the Fatherland;
 2nd class (21 June 2001) – for outstanding contribution to strengthening national defense and active in the patriotic education of young people
 3rd class (30 June 1996) – for services to the state and personal contribution to the development and reform of the Armed Forces of the Russian Federation
 4th class (2 November 2009)
 Order of Alexander Nevsky (23 June 2011) – contribution to strengthening national defense and long-term public activities
 Order of Honour (1 July 2006) – for services to strengthen national defense and work on the patriotic education of youth
 Order of Zhukov (25 April 1995) – for actions in the leadership of the troops in combat operations during the Great Patriotic War of 1941–1945

Soviet Union
 Hero of the Soviet Union (28 April 1980) – for personal courage and the management of troops, manifested in the provision of international assistance to the Democratic Republic of Afghanistan
 Three Orders of Lenin (30 June 1971, 28 April 1980, 30 June 1986)
 Order of the Red Banner, twice (20 April 1953, 22 February 1968)
 Order of Suvorov, 1st class (6 May 1982)
 Order of the Patriotic War, 1st class (6 April 1985)
 Order of the Red Star, twice (14 January 1943, 6 November 1947)
 Order for Service to the Homeland in the Armed Forces of the USSR,  3rd class (30 April 1975)
 Medal For Courage
 Medal for Combat Service
 Jubilee Medal "In Commemoration of the 100th Anniversary since the Birth of Vladimir Il'ich Lenin"
 Medal "For Distinction in Guarding the State Border of the USSR"
 Medal "For the Defence of the Soviet Transarctic"
 Medal "For the Victory over Germany in the Great Patriotic War 1941–1945"
 Medal "For Impeccable Service" 1st class
 jubilee medals

Russian; non-governmental
 Order of Saint Righteous Grand Duke Dmitry Donskoy, 2nd class (Russian Orthodox Church, 2005)

Afghanistan
 Order of the Red Banner (1982)
 Order of the Saur Revolution (1984)

Bulgaria
 Order of Georgi Dimitrov, twice (1985, 1986)
 Order "The People's Republic of Bulgaria" I degree (1974)
 Medal "25 Years of the Bulgarian People's Army" (1969)
 Medal "30 Years of Victory over Fascism" (1975)
 Medal "30 Years of the Bulgarian People's Army" (1974)
 The medal "For Strengthening Brotherhood in Arms" (1977)
 Medal "100 years of the liberation of Bulgaria from the Ottoman yoke" (1978)
 The medal "90th anniversary of the birth of Georgi Dimitrov" (1974)
 Medal "100th Anniversary of Birth of Georgi Dimitrov" (1983)
 Medal "1300 years Bulgaria" (1982)
 Medal "40 Years of Victory over Fascism" (1985)

Hungary
 Order of the Flag of the Hungarian Republic with rubies (1986)
 Medal "For military cooperation", 1st class (1980)

Vietnam
 Order of Ho Chi Minh (1985)
 Order "For Military Valor", 1st class (1983)

East Germany
 Order of Karl Marx (1986)
 Medal "Brotherhood in Arms" (1980)
 Medal "30 Years of the National People's Army" (1986)

Jordan
 Order of Independence, 1st class (1977)

North Korea
 Medal "40 years of Korea's liberation" (1985)

Cuba
 Order of Playa Girón (1986)
 Medal "20 Years of Revolutionary Armed Forces" (1978)
 Medal "30 Years of Revolutionary Armed Forces" (1986)

Mongolia
 Order of Sukhbaatar, twice (1971, 1986)
 Order of the Red Banner (1982)
 Medal "30 Years of Victory over Japan" (1976)
 Medal "30 Years of Victory in Khalkhin" (1969)
 Medal "40 Years of Victory in Khalkhin" (1979)
 Medal "50 Years of the Mongolian People's Revolution" (1972)
 Medal "60 Years of the Mongolian People's Revolution" (1982)
 Medal "50 Years of the Mongolian People's Army" (1971)
 Medal "60 Years of the Armed Forces of the MPR" (1982)

Poland
 Order of Merit of the Republic of Poland, 2nd class (1985)
 Order of Polonia Restituta, 2nd and 3rd classes (1968, 1971)

Romania
 Order of Tudor Vladimirescu, 1st class (1969)
 Order of 23 August (1974)
 Medal "30 Years of Liberation from Fascism Romania" (1974)
 The medal "For Military Merit" (1980)

Czechoslovakia
 Order of Klement Gottwald (1985)
 Medal "For the strengthening of friendship in Arms", 1st class (1972)
 Medal "40 Years of the Slovak National Uprising" (1985)
 Medal "50 Years of the Communist Party of Czechoslovakia" (1971)

Finland
 Order of the White Rose of Finland, 1st class (1986)

In July 2001, on the day of his 90th birthday, was awarded the title "Honorary krymchanin" and made an honorary citizen of Evpatoria.

References

External links 
  Biography

1911 births
2012 deaths
People from Yevpatoria
People from Taurida Governorate
Politburo of the Central Committee of the Communist Party of the Soviet Union candidate members
Soviet Ministers of Defence
Members of the Supreme Soviet of the Soviet Union
Marshals of the Soviet Union
Soviet military personnel of World War II
Soviet military personnel of the Soviet–Afghan War
Russian centenarians
Men centenarians
Heroes of the Soviet Union
Recipients of the Order of Suvorov, 1st class
Recipients of the Order "For Merit to the Fatherland", 2nd class
Recipients of the Order of Zhukov
Recipients of the Order of Honour (Russia)
Recipients of the Order of Lenin
Recipients of the Order of the Red Star
Recipients of the Order of the Red Banner
Recipients of the Order of Alexander Nevsky
Recipients of the Medal "For Courage" (Russia)
Recipients of the Medal "For Distinction in Guarding the State Border of the USSR"
Grand Cordons of the Order of Independence (Jordan)
Recipients of the Order of Saint Righteous Grand Duke Dmitry Donskoy, 2nd class
Commanders with Star of the Order of Merit of the Republic of Poland
Commanders with Star of the Order of Polonia Restituta
Recipients of the Order of Ho Chi Minh
Tashkent Higher Tank Command School alumni
Military Academy of the General Staff of the Armed Forces of the Soviet Union alumni